Netto was a discount supermarket chain in the United Kingdom. Netto arrived in the United Kingdom in December 1990, as part of an internationalisation process by its Danish owner, Salling Group. By May 2010, it operated 193 stores, before it was sold to Asda. In June 2014, Salling Group returned Netto to the United Kingdom, as a 50:50 joint venture with Sainsbury's.

In July 2016, the two companies announced they would end the joint venture, and close all its stores, after Sainsbury's chose to focus on its main business ahead of any further investment.

History

Foundation 

Netto began operating in England in Leeds, on 13 December 1990, with the company's United Kingdom headquarters being in the former mining village of South Elmsall, West Yorkshire.

Expansion 
Netto primarily expanded in central England, before moving into Southern England, namely London. In January 2005, plans for a £200 million investment in South Wales were announced, but were cancelled for logistical issues, resulting in the sale of stores in Barry and Caerphilly. 1,700 jobs were promised in the expansion, but only a few were created.

By May 2010, there were 193 stores in the United Kingdom, all in England and Wales.

Sale to Asda 
In May 2010, Netto UK was bought by Asda for £778 million, to increase its smaller store portfolio. The rebranding of 147 former Netto stores, under the Asda brand was complete by 29 November 2011. Competition laws required Asda to sell the remaining forty seven stores to other companies, such as Morrisons, the convenience store Ugo, and other retailers.

Re establishment with Sainsbury's 
In June 2014, Salling Group announced a 50:50 joint venture, to operate supermarkets with Sainsbury's. The stores were to be between 10,000 sq ft, and 15,000 sq ft in size. Netto opened the first new store in Moor Allerton, Leeds, on 6 November 2014, followed by stores in Sheffield Kilner Way Retail Park, Manchester Heaton Park, Doncaster Edenthorpe and Ormskirk The Hattersley Centre.

On 13 April 2015, it was announced that The Co-operative Food store in Hedon, East Yorkshire, would become the sixth Netto store to launch, following the sale of the existing store.

By December 2015, the company planned to have around 15 Netto stores in Northern England. By 25 January 2016, however, the business operated thirteen stores. On 4 July 2016, it was announced that following a strategic review of the joint partnership, that all stores would be closed during August 2016.

Former operations

Stores 
By 2011, 193 Netto stores were sold to Asda, who under Competition Commission requirements then disposed of twenty seven stores to Morrisons, and twenty stores to Haldanes (including Ugo). This venture failed, with Haldanes going into administration in February 2012, with the twenty stores being sold to Poundstretcher.

The fate of the stores were as follows:
 165 stores rebranded to Asda.
 20 stores sold to Haldanes (Ugo).
 27 stores sold to Morrisons.
 Two stores demolished.

The Netto store in Halifax, West Yorkshire was demolished. There were proposals for the store to be turned into offices, whilst the car park was developed into Broad Street Plaza, an entertainment complex.
The store in Wolverhampton City Centre was also demolished in 2015 and developed into the new market area.

Store format 
Netto stores carried a discount supermarket style store format. Many prices were very similar to wholesale prices, in a style and concept closest to the Kwik Save brand. To enforce fairness to all shoppers, many offers were limited to six per person. Netto sold brand name products, such as Pepsi and Walkers Crisps, which were often parallel imports.

See also
Netto (store)
Salling Group
Sainsbury's

References

External links

Official website

Supermarkets of the United Kingdom
Discount shops of the United Kingdom
Salling Group
Sainsbury's
Defunct retail companies of the United Kingdom